The Gerry Reilly Memorial under-16 Inter-County Football Tournament is an annual Gaelic football competition in the province of Leinster in Ireland. The tournament was started in 1989, named after a young Gaelic footballer Gerry Reilly who was killed in December 1987 at sixteen years of age.

Format
The cup is run on a 'round robin' basis. In other words, each team plays each other and the two top teams progress to the final. Four counties participated in the 2007 tournament, Kildare, Westmeath, Dublin and Meath and formerly Cavan. The 2007 final was contested by both Meath and Dublin.

Dublin were the 2006 champions having defeated Westmeath 4–13 to 1–8 in the decider in Gilson Park, Oldcastle, County Meath. In 2007, Meath prevented Dublin from retaining the title by defeating them by 4–09 to 0–12 at Oldcastle.

Eight counties competed in 2016 including Meath, Monaghan, Cavan, Westmeath, Dublin, Wicklow, Louth & Longford with Cavan winning the Cup final by overcoming Dublin in the final with Meath securing the Plate with a decisive victory over Westmeath.

In 2017 eight counties have again entered the completion with Group 1 comprising Louth, Longford, Laois and Meath. Group 2 includes Dublin, Westmeath, Monaghan and Wicklow.

Sponsorship
The main sponsor is Valu – Kitchens & Bedrooms from Gleneagle. 'The 'Man of the Match' award is sponsored for every game in the tournament by Peter and Patricia Caffrey of Interior Creations Ltd., Oldcastle.'.

2007
The 2007 tournament is run on a 'round robin' basis, which means each team plays each other once. The winning team from each game gets two points for a win and one point is given for a draw. The two top teams in the tournament play each other in the final.

Roll of honour

No tournament in 2009.

Winners of the Gerry Reilly Plate to date:

Meath..........                     2013, 2015, 2016

Wicklow........                     2014

Winners of the Gerry Reilly Shield to date:

Westmeath......                     2013

Meath..........                     2014

Monaghan.......                     2015

External links
Latest Results and Fixtures

Gaelic football cup competitions
Leinster GAA inter-county football competitions
Under-16 sport